Organ-limited amyloidosis is a category of amyloidosis where the distribution can be associated primarily with a single organ. It is contrasted to systemic amyloidosis, and it can be caused by several different types of amyloid.

In almost all of the organ-specific pathologies, there is debate as to whether the amyloid plaques are the causal agent of the disease or instead a downstream consequence of a common idiopathic agent.  The associated proteins are indicated in parentheses.

Neurological amyloid
 Alzheimer's disease (Aβ 39-43)
 Parkinson's disease (alpha-synuclein)
 Huntington's disease (huntingtin protein)
 Transmissible spongiform encephalopathies caused by prion protein (PrP) were sometimes classed as amyloidoses, as one of the four pathological features in diseased tissue is the presence of amyloid plaques. These diseases include;
 Creutzfeldt–Jakob disease (PrP in cerebrum)
 Kuru (diffuse PrP deposits in brain)
 Fatal familial insomnia (PrP in thalamus)
 Bovine spongiform encephalopathy (PrP in cerebrum of cows)

Cardiovascular amyloid
 Cardiac amyloidosis
 Senile cardiac amyloidosis-may cause heart failure

Other
 Amylin deposition can occur in the pancreas in some cases of type 2 diabetes mellitus
 Cerebral amyloid angiopathy

References

External links 

Amyloidosis
Histopathology
Structural proteins